Robert Hogan is a judge currently serving on the Tax Court of Canada. He took office on March 3, 2008.

References

Living people
Judges of the Tax Court of Canada
Place of birth missing (living people)
Year of birth missing (living people)
Université de Sherbrooke alumni
21st-century Canadian judges